Line 10 is an east-west line on the Nanjing Metro system, running from  to .

The eastern section of Line 10 is the former Line 1 section between Andemen and Olympic Sport Center stations. Together with its west extension, it broke away from Line 1 to form a standalone line on July 1, 2014.

Opening timeline

Station list

References

External links 
Line 10 on the official Nanjing Metro website (includes route map) 

Nanjing Metro lines
Siemens Mobility projects
Railway lines opened in 2014